The Perl PG-130 Penetrator is an American mid-wing, single-seat glider that was designed and constructed by Harry Perl.

Design and development
The PG-130 was completed in 1953. The aircraft has a wooden structure, with the wings and tail covered in doped aircraft fabric covering. The  span wing employs a Göttingen Gö 549 airfoil and features dive brakes. The wing has a foam-filled leading edge. The tail is an all-flying design. The aircraft originally took off from a jettisonable take-off dolly and landed on a fixed skid, but was later modified with a fixed monowheel.

The sole example of the PG-130 was registered with the US Federal Aviation Administration  as an Experimental - Amateur-built.

Operational history
Soaring Magazine reported in 1983 that Perl still owned the aircraft and was flying it at that time. The PG-130 was removed from the FAA register prior to 1989 and now belongs to the National Soaring Museum, where it was listed as "in storage" in June 2011.

Aircraft on display
National Soaring Museum - in storage

Specifications (PG-130)

See also

References

1950s United States sailplanes
Homebuilt aircraft
Aircraft first flown in 1953
Mid-wing aircraft